Emerson Avenue Addition Historic District, also known as Emerson Heights Addition and Charles M. Cross Trust Clifford Avenue Addition, is a national historic district located at Indianapolis, Indiana.  It encompasses 1,000 contributing buildings and 9 contributing objects in a planned residential section of Indianapolis.  The district developed between about 1910 and 1949, and includes representative examples of Tudor Revival, Colonial Revival, and Bungalow / American Craftsman style residential architecture.

It was listed on the National Register of Historic Places in 2012.

References

Historic districts on the National Register of Historic Places in Indiana
Tudor Revival architecture in Indiana
Colonial Revival architecture in Indiana
Bungalow architecture in Indiana
Historic districts in Indianapolis
National Register of Historic Places in Indianapolis